ZISMV: Vlezhdatl is a science fiction tabletop role-playing game supplement, drawn and designed by Jordan Weisman, L. Ross Babcock III, with scenarios by J. Andrew Keith, and a cover by William H. Keith for Traveller, published by FASA in 1981.

Contents
ZISMV: Vlezhdatl is a set of 15mm starship deckplans for the Zhodani Interstellar Military Vessel the Vlezhdatl, a 2000-ton strike cruiser.

Publication history
ZISMV: Vlezhdatl was written by Jordan Weisman and L. Ross Babcock III, with J. Andrew Keith, and was published in 1981 by FASA as an 8-page pamphlet with nine maps.

Reception
William A. Barton reviewed ZISMV: Vlezhdatl in The Space Gamer No. 46. Barton commented that "unless you're one who prefers to draw your own plans, you should find the ZISMV: Vlezhdatl of definite use in your campaigns, particularly those taking place against the backdrop of the Fifth Frontier War."

Reviews
 Different Worlds #18 (Jan., 1982)

References

Role-playing game supplements introduced in 1981
Traveller (role-playing game) supplements